Savae Keneti James Fitzgerald Apa, Moata'a (born 17 June 1997) is a New Zealand actor, singer and musician. He has received various accolades, including a Saturn Award and nominations for an MTV Movie & TV Award, two People's Choice Awards and two Teen Choice Awards, and was appointed the matai title of Savae chief of his village Moata'a in September 2022.

He began acting playing Kane Jenkins in the New Zealand primetime soap opera Shortland Street from 2013 to 2015. In 2017, Apa was cast in the lead role of Archie Andrews in the CW drama series Riverdale. In film, Apa has starred in A Dog's Purpose (2017), The Hate U Give (2018) and I Still Believe (2020). In 2021, he released his debut solo album, the indie folk-rock album Clocks, which received some attention on Spotify and TikTok.

Early life
Apa was born on 17 June 1997 at Waitakere Hospital in Auckland, New Zealand, the son of Tupa'i and Tessa Apa (née Callander). His father is Samoan and a matai (chief) of his village in Samoa; his mother is a European New Zealander. He has two older sisters and is the nephew of former rugby union player and coach Michael Jones. He attended high school at King's College in Auckland before beginning his acting career.

Career

Early work and breakthrough (20132017)

From 2013 to 2015, Apa starred as Kane Jenkins in the New Zealand prime-time soap opera Shortland Street. In 2016, he was cast as Archie Andrews in the CW drama series Riverdale, after a four-month worldwide talent search.

In 2017, he starred as Ethan Montgomery in the comedy-drama film A Dog's Purpose, which was released on the same day as Riverdale premiered on television.

Further films and critical fluctuations (20182020)
His next film role was replacing Kian Lawley in the 2018 drama film The Hate U Give. He starred as Griffin in the Netflix film The Last Summer, which was released on 3 May 2019. He also starred as singer Jeremy Camp in the biographical romantic drama film I Still Believe, which was released in March 2020.

Apa starred in Adam Mason's critically panned 2020 thriller film Songbird, produced by Michael Bay's Platinum Dunes. The film was accused of using the COVID-19 pandemic to create a thrill plot. In May 2021, Lionsgate Films announced he would appear in a military based drama West Pointer.

Music ventures (2021present)
In 2021, he independently released his debut album, Clocks, which explores the folk rock and indie genres. It gained some attention on Spotify and TikTok.

Personal life

Apa was involved in a minor car accident in Vancouver in September 2017, but was uninjured when the passenger side of his car hit a light pole. The late-night crash was reportedly the result of him falling asleep at the wheel after a long day of filming.

Since 2020, Apa has been in a relationship with French model Clara Berry. Their child was born in September 2021.

Apa was raised in a Christian family and has stated that he is a Christian. In April 2018, he publicly criticized Australian rugby player Israel Folau for claiming that it was God's plan to send gay people to hell, describing Folau's comments as "disappointing".

Moata'a rule
In September 2022, he was awarded the matai title of Savae by his native village Moata'a in New Zealand.

Filmography

Film

Television

Discography
In addition to soundtrack work on Shortland Street, Riverdale and I Still Believe, Apa has released independent music.
 The Third Room (2012)
 Clocks (2021)

Awards and nominations

Note

References

External links

 

1997 births
21st-century New Zealand male actors
Actors of Samoan descent
Living people
New Zealand Christians
New Zealand male film actors
New Zealand male soap opera actors
New Zealand male television actors
New Zealand people of European descent
New Zealand people of Samoan descent
People educated at King's College, Auckland
People from Auckland
Samoan chiefs